Ponsse Plc  is a company domiciled in Vieremä, Finland, a forest machine manufacturer run by the Vidgrén family. Ponsse manufactures, sells and maintains cut-to-length forest machines such as forwarders and harvesters and also builds their information systems. Harvesters operate digitally: for example, production data is reported daily to the client.

Ponsse is one of the world’s largest forest machine manufacturers. It is the market leader in Finland: more than 40 per cent of all forest machines in Finland are made by Ponsse. All machines are manufactured in the company’s birthplace in Vieremä. Ponsse Group employs about 1,800 people in 10 countries, and the company’s shares are quoted on the NASDAQ OMX Nordic List.

History

1970s – The early years

In 1969, forest machine entrepreneur Einari Vidgrén was working at Tehdaspuu Oy’s logging site, where he built a forest machine from a wheel loader’s components. The forwarder was named PONSSE Paz according to a crossbreed hunting dog. 

Tehdaspuu requested Vidgrén to build more forest machines, and Einari asked the municipality of Vieremä to build him a machine shop where he could build his machines. In 1970, a decision was made to build a 300 m2 machine shop, which was then leased out to Vidgrén. Ponsse Oy was established in the same year.  

In 1971, Einari placed an ad in the Helsingin Sanomat news paper in order to recruit the first engineer for the factory. Jouko Kelppe, a young engineer from Salo was hired. The manufacturing of the first machine was started in the spring of 1971. A forest machine contractor Eero Vainikainen was in the process of purchasing a Volvo or Valmet machine. However, after strong persuasion and visiting the Ponsse factory, he decided to buy the first ever Ponsse machine. The machine was driven out of the factory by Einari in the autumn of 1971.

Ponsse premiered in the international markets in 1974. A massive storm hit Germany, and a large number of foreign equipment was needed for harvesting the trees felled by the storm. Einari heard that the job was well compensated, and set out to Germany, accompanied by Finnish loggers and a Ponsse machine.

During its first ten years, the company manufactured roughly 50 machines, each of which was mainly sold in Eastern Finland.

1980s – Ponsse is sold

In 1980, Ponsse had some twenty employees and net sales of approximately FIM 10 million. Products, harvesting machines and forwarders were mainly manufactured for timber companies and private contractors. In addition, Ponsse started to develop a harvester, a universal forest machine, for felling, delimbing, sawing and sorting trees.

Mechanized harvesting was increasing worldwide, and heavy machinery was becoming a talking point. The public demanded lighter and more eco-friendly machines. Ponsse released a new model S 15 forwarder in 1983. The machine was highly advanced at the time, as it was lighter but was still able to carry heavy loads, as well as function on soil with poor bearing capacity.

In the middle of the 1980s, the company’s net sales exceeded FIM 40 million. The increase in net sales came especially from the new S-series forwarder model. Its frame was made from light aluminium.

In 1986, Ponsse introduced PONSSE H520, a new lightweight harvester, the PONSSE HN125 harvester crane and the H60 harvesting unit. Ponsse became the market leader in harvesting machines in Finland.

On 16 December in 1988, Ponsse's entire share capital was transferred to the industrial company called Interpolator Oy, a part of SKOP banking group. This made Ponsse a part of Norcar forest machine group, along with some earlier acquisitions. Einari became a board member of Norcar Group, and Einari's brother, Esa Vidgren, was appointed as the managing director of Ponsse Plc.

1990s – The Vidgréns buy Ponsse back

The computerized Kajaani 2000 loader control system represented the latest trend in the product development of forest machine control systems. In 1992, Ponsse released two new machines, the HS10 harvester and the S10 forwarder. Einari received the Finnish National Inventor Prize awarded by the Ministry of Trade and Industry, in recognition of his persistent work in the forest machine development.

After Norcar went bankrupt in 1992, SKOP acquired Ponsse and its subsidiary Kajaanin Automatiikka from it.

In February 1993, a group of investors, led by Einari Vidgrén, including OKO Venture Capital Oy and Start Fund of Kera Oy, bought Ponsse back.  Einari’s brother Esa Vidgrén started as the company’s new President and CEO. Kajaanin Automatiikka Oy, a subsidiary specialised in information system, was also merged into the company.

Next year, the company was listed on the Helsinki stock exchange. Its products were sold in 11 countries.

Ponsse’s forest machines first went online in 1997. In the forest industries, information systems started to use data produced by forest machines in forwarding trees directly to their correct destinations, for example.

2000s – Years of growth end in a recession

Ponsse's 30th anniversary party was organized in 2000, and the occasion was used to announce a brand new product family with Mercedes Benz engines. The new Beaver harvester was launched, as well as a new digital control system, called OptiControl. New retailer was established in New Brunswick and Quebec, Canada. The Finnish Forest Association granted Einari a golden medal for his special and long-term contribution to the forest industry in Finland in 2001.

Ponsse Road Show was organized as Einari's 60th year celebration tour in 2003. The tour traveled through ten locations in Finland, presenting machines and meeting customers across the country. The 3000th manufactured Ponsse machine was handed out during the tour. New product line was launched in 2004, including Remote Service, the first ever real-time remote service connection in the forest machine industry. Ponsse became the main owner of Epec Oy, a control system manufacturer in Seinäjoki. Ponsse Ladies was founded.

Arto Tiitinen started as Ponsse’s President and CEO in 2004. He had previously worked at Valtra in managerial positions in marketing and sales.

In 2005, Ponsse established a subsidiary in Russia.

Einari created a foundation bearing his name to make the entrepreneurship related to wood harvesting better known, and to increase the awareness of the mechanized harvesting industry, especially among the younger generation. The factory in Vieremä was expanded, and a new service center was established in Iisalmi. Several sponsorship deals were announced, including the javelin thrower Tero Pitkämäki, WRC-driver Mikko Hirvonen, and ice hockey team Kalpa. Another subsidiary, Ponsse Latin America, was established in Brazil, and a retail agreement in South Africa. New Bear harvester and Elephant forwarder were introduced in 2006.

In 2007, Ponsse established subsidiaries in China and Hong Kong, and the Vieremä factory underwent a considerable expansion. International Road Show tour  traveled through various locations across Europe. Ponsse began cooperation with the Moscow State University. The goal is to offer extensive training in the cut-to-length logging method.

In February 2008, Tiitinen announced his appointment as the managing director of Keskisuomalainen Oyj. Ponsse Group had subsidiaries in Sweden, the USA, France and the UK. Tiitinen’s successor as Ponsse’s President and CEO was Juho Nummela, D.Sc. (Tech.). In September almost 30 000 visitors from all over the world gathered in Metko exhibition, the biggest forestry event in Finland. Ponsse’s future was looking so bright that the company focused on increasing its production capacity.

In January 2009, Einari Vidgrén set a schedule for a project to launch a new eight-wheel model alongside six-wheeler harvesters: “Fox will cut its first tree by Easter”. The new eight-wheeler Fox was manufactured on schedule, in four months, receiving positive feedback from users. For several years, Ponsse was the only company manufacturing eight-wheeler harvesters. During the economic slump in 2009 caused by financial crisis of 2007-08, Ponsse’s net sales fell below 150 million euros. Forest machine manufacturing diminished to a quarter from the previous year. In summer, the daily capacity was five machines, with seven machines being in the order books. Due to weakened demand and the future prospects for the forest machine industry, Ponsse gave summons for employee cooperation negotiations. During the crisis, Ponsse started to focus on research and development.

2010s – After Einari Vidgrén

Einari Vidgrén passed away after a sudden illness during a business trip in October 2010. His son Juha Vidgrén was appointed as his successor as the Chair of the Board of Directors. Einari's four sons were the primary shareowners of the company.

The Ponsse Scorpion harvester was regarded as a larger technological leap forward than the previously introduced Fox. Its sales started in 2014. In Scorpion, the cabin also remains levelled on slopes, and most of its technological solutions were completely new. Scorpion has been compared to a mobile computer, with its cabin equipped with a keyboard, touchscreen and two controllers. Its operations can be monitored online using a smartphone or other device. The machine costs approximately half a million euros, and it made Ponsse one of the pioneers of the Internet of things in Finland.

In 2015 Ponsse accounted for roughly a quarter of the global forest machine markets. The 10,000th Ponsse machine was manufactured. 

In 2016 the company employed more software designers than design engineers specialised in mechanics. Ponsse’s machines were fitted with so many sensors that they provided big data, which could be used in machine maintenance and in improving the operator’s efficiency. In March, Ponsse held the Industryhack event, at which teams of coders thought of new ways to use machine data. Ponsse announced 32 million euro investments on their factory in Vieremä.

In autumn 2017, Ponsse and its subsidiary Epec established an R&D unit in Tampere, specialising in software and automation design for mobile machines. Software was used in such applications as machine controls and measuring devices.

In August 2018, Ponsse completed its factory expansion in Vieremä. The expansion cost EUR 38 million and gave Ponsse 40,000 square metres of production facilities.

In November 2019, Ponsse announced that it will build a service centre in Joensuu. Ponsse Group employed nearly 1,800 people and operated in more than 40 countries. Exports made up 80 per cent of net sales. Ponsse Group’s net sales were EUR 667.4 million, and its operating profit was EUR 67.3 million.

2020s 
In January 2020, Ponsse announced that it will celebrate its 50th anniversary by launching a roadshow, visiting 105 locations in 28 countries. In May, Jarmo Vidgrén was appointed the Chair of Ponsse’s Board of Directors. His predecessor Juha Vidgrén continued as a member of the Board.

In August 2021, the serial production of Scorpion equipped with the future cabin (Fuca) started. Customers were able to participate in R&D, helping to improve ergonomics. The harvester was also equipped with the new Opti 5G information system and a 15.6” touchscreen. The cabin was awarded in the Red Dot competition.

In February 2022, Ponsse and its subsidiary Epec opened an R&D unit in Turku.

Organisation
Since 2015, Ponsse’s organisational structure has been based on three key processes:
sales and maintenance,
supply chain, and
R&D.

In 2020, the company had 1,750 employees, 930 of whom in Finland. Ponsse had customers in 45 countries. Epec, Ponsse’s technology company, employed 125 people. Ponsse Group’s net sales totalled 636.6 million euros, of which exports accounted for 80 per cent. The company had 12 subsidiaries located in Brazil, the UK, Ireland, China, Norway, France, Sweden, Uruguay, Russia and the USA. Ponsse had dealers in the USA, China, Romania, Canada and Italy among other locations. The company’s dealer network consisted of 42 companies in more than 40 countries.

In autumn 2021, Ponsse acquired the service centre of its local dealer in Chile.

In December 2021, Ponsse’s ten largest shareholders were Juha Vidgrén, Jukka Vidgrén, Janne Vidgrén, Jarmo Vidgrén, equity fund Nordea Nordic Small Cap, Skandinaviska Enskilda Banken, Ilmarinen Mutual Pension Insurance Company, Varma Mutual Pension Insurance Company, the Einari Vidgrén Foundation SR, and equity fund Evli Finland. Majority shares and votes in the company are held by the Vidgrén family.

Ponsse cooperates with educational institutions, such as Ylä-Savo Vocational College (YSAO) and Savonia University of Applied Sciences.

Products

Ponsse manufactures, sells and maintains cut-to-length forest machines and also builds their information systems. Ponsse’s forest machines have been widely regarded as pioneers in IoT applications. Its harvesters operate digitally. Production data and volumes of assortments brought to the roadside are reported daily to forest companies. Instructions regarding harvesting and felling needs at logging sites are also provided online.

Ponsse, together with the South Savonia rescue department, has developed the Mörkö forest machine, a forest machine featuring a water tank, pump system and water cannon. Mörkö was used to fight the wildfire in the Taipalsaari peat production area in June 2019 and in the final extinguishing of the Kalajoki forest fire in August 2021, and it has been sold globally in Canada, for example. Mörkö is driven by a forest machine operator and the water cannon is operated by a trained firefighter. A forest machine can access areas that would otherwise remain inaccessible.

Ponsse manufactures and sells a variety of forestry equipment, such as harvesters, forwarders, and harvester heads. Every product is manufactured at the company's headquarters in Vieremä, Finland.

Awards and recognitions
 In autumn 1983, Vidgrén was recognised as the entrepreneur of the year in Upper Savonia.
 In 1985, Vidgrén received the national award of the entrepreneur of the year.
 Vidgrén received the Finnish honorary title of Vuorineuvos (mining counsellor) in 1997.
 Ponsse has received the Internationalisation Award of the President of the Republic twice: in 2003 and 2017. Ponsse is the first company to have received the recognition twice. The Finland 100 anniversary award was granted in recognition of the company’s decades of international profitable growth and modernisation ability.
 Between 2013 and 2015, the Ponsse Scorpion harvester won the Viva Automation!, the Quality Innovation of the Year and the Fennia Prize Grand Prix awards, the Swedish Steel Prize competition held by steel company SSAB, and the Red Dot award.
 In 2015, Ponsse was ranked the second most reputable company in Finland in research company T-Media Oy’s Reputation&Trust survey. In 2021, Ponsse came in first place in the survey for the fourth year in succession.
 In 2016, Ponsse received the growth award at the Kasvu Open event.
 In 2017, the Finnish Family Firms Association selected Ponsse as the Family Business of the Year 2017.
 In 2018, Juho Nummela, Ponsse’s President and CEO, was selected as the Businessperson of the Year, and private investors named Ponsse as the best medium-sized listed company.
 In 2019, the Federation of Finnish Enterprises, Savonia Region, gave Ponsse the regional entrepreneurship award.
 In 2020, Ponsse received the Oulu-based Ethics Award.
 In 2021, Ponsse’s Scorpion harvester cabin won the Best of the Best award in the product design category in the Red Dot competition.

References

Companies listed on Nasdaq Helsinki
Manufacturing companies established in 1970
Finnish brands
Finnish companies established in 1970